A ballastless track or slab track is a type of railway track infrastructure in which the traditional elastic combination of ties/sleepers and ballast is replaced by a rigid construction of concrete or asphalt.

Characteristics 
In ballastless tracks, the rails are rigidly fastened to special types of concrete ties/sleepers that are themselves set in concrete. Ballastless tracks therefore offer a high consistency in track geometry, the adjusting of which is not possible after the concreting of the superstructure. The elasticity of the ballast in the traditional railway superstructure is replaced by flexibility between either the rails and the concrete ties/sleepers or the ties/sleepers and the concrete or asphalt slab as well inherent elasticity within the conglomerate of the tie/sleeper, whereas the concrete or asphalt slab is usually inelastic.

Advantages 
The advantages of a ballastless track over a traditional superstructure are its highly consistent track geometry, its longer life span, and the reduced need for maintenance.

A ballastless track’s track geometry is achieved mainly due its relative inelasticity in comparison to a traditional superstructure that results in far fewer deformations and generally smoother running; train drivers (engineers) of the London Overground's East London Line have informally declared the Low Vibration Track system as the smoothest superstructure they have experienced.

This in turn increases the track’s life span and reduces the need for maintenance. The usual preventive maintenance is limited to rail grinding, since tamping is not necessary due to the absence of ballast. Curative maintenance beyond rail replacement is required only after several decades. The Swiss Federal Railways replaced the ties/sleepers and rubber shoes of the ballastless track in the -long Heitersberg Tunnel between 2014 and 2016, whereas no maintenance of the concrete slab was necessary 39 years after the tunnel’s opening. Due to its good experiences with the system, the Swiss Federal Railways are looking to install ballastless track wherever there is a rigid substructure—in tunnels as well as on viaducts.

Further advantages of ballastless tracks include better and controlled drainage, the elimination of flying-ballast damage on rolling stock and civil engineering structures, a shallower superstructure, and the possibility of run-over sections such as crossings over which pneumatic vehicles can be driven. When used in stations, ballastless tracks are easier to clean.

Disadvantages 
The primary disadvantage of a ballastless track is its significantly higher cost of initial construction. While numbers vary depending on construction type and track infrastructure (ballastless tracks are generally more suitable to infrastructures that are also made of concrete, as is the case in tunnels or on viaducts), the Deutsche Bahn estimated in 2015 that construction costs of ballastless tracks are 28 percent higher than those of traditional superstructure. However, the life-cycle cost of ballastless tracks are generally lower than those of ballasted tracks due to significantly lower maintenance.

Further disadvantages of ballastless tracks are the impossibility of adjusting or correcting track geometry once concrete has been set, the necessity of a stable infrastructure (since no adjustments can be made to the superstructure), higher noise emissions, and longer repair times when the concrete slab is damaged (e.g. due to construction faults or wear and tear).  The inflexibility of the track has been cited as well.

Construction Types 
Early slab track projects a range of construction types, sub-bases and fastening technologies. The following list contains construction types of ballastless tracks that have been internationally used in heavy-rail systems (as opposed to light railways, tramways, or metros) in chronological order of their first usage.

SBB Bözberg/STEDEF (SBB) 
The Bözberg/STEDEF system consists of twin ties/sleepers that are connected by a steel track rod and enclosed in a rubber shoe. All of its components can be exchanged individually. Bözberg/STEDEF was first used by the Swiss Federal Railways in the Bözberg tunnel in 1966. STEDEF was further developed by SATEBA prior to the system’s installation on the French LGV Méditeranée.

Rheda (Rail.One) 
The Rheda system consists of three layers: a base course and two slabs that are joined by rebars, as are the individual ties/sleepers. Rheda was first used by the Deutsche Bahn in Rheda-Wiedenbrück station, after which it is named, in 1972. It has since been installed on the Dutch HSL-Zuid route between Amsterdam and Rotterdam, in the Spanish Guadarrama and Sant Joan Despí tunnels, and on various Chinese high-speed lines including Wuhan–Guangzhou High-Speed Railway.

Bögl (Max Bögl) 
The Bögl ballastless track is characterised by its use of prefabricated concrete slabs in lieu of a continuous structure that is cast on site. Mortar is used to connect the 9-ton-slabs to the infrastructure and to one another. The Bögl system was developed in Germany and first tested in Dachau in 1977. The first serial installation took place in Schleswig-Holstein and Heidelberg in 1999. For its use on the high-speed link between Beijing and Shanghai, 406,000 slabs were installed.

FF ÖBB/PORR (PORR) 
The ÖBB/PORR ballastless track (FF stands for German Feste Fahrbahn, meaning ballastless or, literally, fixed track) consists of an elastically supported track slab. It was first tested in 1989, became the standard system in Austria in 1995, and has been used for over 700 kilometres of track worldwide, including the German Verkehrsprojekt Deutsche Einheit Nr. 8 (German Unity Transport Project 8) and the Doha metro. The system will be used on the first phases of the United Kingdom's High Speed 2 line, except in tunnels and for some specialist structures.

Low Vibration Track (Sonneville/Vigier Rail) 
The Low Vibration Track (LVT) system is similar to Bözberg/STEDEF in that it also uses twin ties/sleepers enclosed in rubber shoes. However, LVT does not feature a tie rod. The system was developed and tested by Roger Sonneville together with the Swiss Federal Railways in the 1990s before the rights were sold to Vigier Rail in 2009. LVT has been in service in the Channel tunnel since 1994. Due to the tunnel’s German name Eurotunnel, LVT is sometimes referred to as Euroblock. LVT has been used for over 1300 kilometres of track worldwide, including the Swiss Lötschberg, Gotthard and Ceneri base tunnels, the South Korean high-speed Suin Line between Songdo and Incheon, the Turkish Marmaray project, and the London Overgound's East London line, as well as on viaducts in urban areas. LVT has become the standard ballastless-track system in Switzerland.

IVES 
The IVES system (Intelligent, Versatile, Efficient and Solid) is a product of Rhomberg Rail. The system consists of a base layer (preferably common asphalt concrete) and concrete lateral structural elements, in which the rail fastening elements of the type DFF 304 are directly embedded – no ties/sleepers are needed. The necessary elasticity is given only by a flexible intermediate plate in the rail fastening elements.

The structural elements of this system are individually manufactured and can be positioned laterally or longitudinally onto the base layer. The structural elements have recesses in the top, where the rail fastening elements are placed into. Afterwards, the rails are lifted onto the fastening elements and a track grid is established. The grid’s exact position can now be adjusted vertically and laterally. At last, the rail fastening elements are friction-locked to the structural elements with high-strength grouting mortar. Thanks to its versatile construction and easy installation, IVES is suitable for all rail types.

After testing, the first IVES track has been installed in the Asfordby Tunnel of the Old Dalby Test Track in England in 2013 and since then, 7 more IVES tracks have been built. The longest IVES track runs through the Bruggwaldtunnel in Switzerland, with a total length of 1,731 m.

See also 
Baulk track and slab track are similar in that the rails are continuously supported, compared to ordinary track where the rails have to "bridge" the gaps between the sleepers.

References 

Railway line types
Railway track layouts